Space Cadets was a British comedy panel game broadcast on Channel 4 in 1997.  It was presented by "High Commander" Greg Proops with Bill Bailey and Craig Charles as the "Space Captains" (captains of the two teams).  It ran for just one series with 10 episodes.

Like the BBC's Have I Got News for You, the contestants were celebrities and the show was played mainly for laughs. Bestselling author Terry Pratchett once appeared as a guest. When the contestants were asked who was Britain's most shoplifted author, Pratchett immediately answered "I am!" which was the correct answer. (The other contestants and Proops all immediately pulled out "shoplifted" copies of Pratchett's books, one of which Pratchett proceeded to sign.)

Opening sequence text
The following text appeared on the screen in the opening title sequence (over footage of Charles, Bailey and Proops): 3 Cosmic Comics, On A Journey From Planet Mirth To Do Battle Against The Weird, The Unthinkable, The Unknown.  They Are Space Cadets.

Rounds
These are only some of the rounds used on the show.  It is unknown if any other rounds were played in episodes 8 or 9.

Doctor, Who Am I? has each team captain standing center stage and being "morphed" into a character that may or may not be related to sci-fi.  They then ask their teammates questions which can only be answered with "negative" or "affirmative" in order to decipher their "new identities".
Space Oddities has each member of a team giving explanations of what they think a given object is, with only one being right.  The opposing team must guess which is correct.
The War of The Words is like Film Dub on Whose Line Is It Anyway?, but with a sci-fi clip.
What Happens Next? has each team guessing what happens next in a sci-fi film shown to them.
Photon Photos has the teams guessing what is happening in a still photo and what movie it is from.
How Did They Get Out of That? has each team watching a clip of sci-fi characters in peril and guessing how the characters get out of peril.
Mind Your Klingon has Proops giving a phrase in the Klingon language and the players must translate the phrase into English.
Bill Shatner or not Bill Shatner has Proops read a series of facts proporting to pertain to William Shatner. Teams, including William Shatner himself, respond 'Bill Shatner' or 'Not Bill Shatner' according to whether they believe it to be true or not. 
Final All-Comers Trivia Scan has Proops asking the teams sci-fi trivia questions until time runs out.

Episode guide
The coloured backgrounds denote the result of each of the shows:
 -- indicates Craig's team won
 -- indicates Bill's team won

Notes

External links

1990s British comedy television series
1990s British science fiction television series
1990s British game shows
1997 British television series debuts
1997 British television series endings
Channel 4 game shows
British panel games